The Letter of the Karaite elders of Ascalon (c. 1100) was a communication written by six elders of the Karaite Jewish community of Ascalon and sent to their coreligionists in Alexandria nine months after the fall of Jerusalem during the First Crusade. The contents describe how the Ascalon elders pooled money to pay the initial ransom for pockets of Jews and holy relics being held captive in Jerusalem by the Crusaders, the fate of some of these refugees after their release (including their transport to Alexandria, contraction of the plague, or death at sea), and the need for additional funds for the rescuing of further captives. It was written in Judeo-Arabic, Arabic using the Hebrew alphabet.

This and other such letters related to the Crusader conquest of Jerusalem were discovered by noted historian S.D. Goitein in 1952 among the papers of the Cairo Geniza. Goitein first published his findings in Zion, a Hebrew journal, and then presented a partial English translation of the letter in the Journal of Jewish Studies that same year. Since then, it has been retranslated in several other books pertaining to the Crusades. Goitein's final and most complete English translation appeared in his final book posthumously published in 1988.

See also

Aleppo Codex
Battle of Ascalon
Crusades
Siege of Ascalon

References

External links
University of Michigan. The letter based on Goitein's incomplete 1952 English translation (Internet Archive). Retrieved 20-08-2007.

First Crusade
Manuscripts from the Cairo Geniza
Medieval Jerusalem
Christian antisemitism in the Middle Ages
Jews and Judaism in Egypt
Jews and Judaism in Jerusalem
Jews and Judaism in the Kingdom of Jerusalem
Judeo-Arabic literature
Karaite Judaism
Letters (message)
1100 in Asia
1100
11th-century Judaism
11th century in the Fatimid Caliphate